Entre Rios de Minas is a Brazilian municipality located in the state of Minas Gerais. The city belongs to the mesoregion Metropolitana de Belo Horizonte and to the microregion of Conselheiro Lafaiete.

The Campolina horse breed originated in the Entre Rios de Minas. Cassiano Campolina of the Fazenda Tanque farm developed the Campolina in 1870 from a mare named "Medéia" and a stallion belonging to Mariano Procópio, who received the stallion from Dom Pedro II.

See also
 List of municipalities in Minas Gerais

References

Municipalities in Minas Gerais
1714 establishments in the Portuguese Empire